Righa is a village development committee in Baglung District in the Dhaulagiri Zone of central Nepal. At the time of the 1991 Nepal census it had a population of 3,728 and had 680 houses in the town.

References

Populated places in Baglung District